Bower-Cox House is a historic house located on SR 1595 southwest of Scottville, Ashe County, North Carolina. It is locally significant for its association with its builder and owners.

Description and history 
The original section was built about 1820, and is a two-story, Late Federal style block with a one-story shed-roof porch. A Late Victorian addition, now regarded as the "front" of the house, is a two-story frame block with a one-story shed-roof porch on one side and a two-story porch on the opposite.

It was listed on the National Register of Historic Places on November 7, 1976.

References

Houses on the National Register of Historic Places in North Carolina
Federal architecture in North Carolina
Victorian architecture in North Carolina
Houses completed in 1820
Houses in Ashe County, North Carolina
National Register of Historic Places in Ashe County, North Carolina